Below is a list of National Amateur Boxing Super Heavyweight (AAU) Champions, also known as United States Amateur Champions, along with the state or region which they represented.  The United States National Boxing Championships bestow the title of United States Amateur Champion on amateur boxers for winning the annual national amateur boxing tournament organized by USA Boxing, the national governing body for Olympic boxing and is the United States member organization of the International Amateur Boxing Association (AIBA).  It is one of four premier amateur boxing tournaments, the other being the National Golden Gloves Tournament, which crowns its own amateur super heavyweight champion, the Police Athletic League Tournament, and the United States Armed Forces Tournament, all sending champions to the US Olympic Trials.  The Super Heavyweight division is contested at a weight class of 201+ pounds.  

1981 - Tyrell Biggs, Philadelphia, PA
1982 - Tyrell Biggs, Philadelphia, PA
1983 - Warren Thompson, Baltimore, MD
1984 - Nathaniel Fitch, US Army
1985 - Wesley Watson, US Army
1986 - Alex Garcia, San Fernando, CA
1987 - Charlton Hollis, Fort Lauderdale, FL
1988 - Robert Salters, US Army
1989 - Ed Donaldson, US Marines
1990 - Edward Escobedo, McKinney, TX
1991 - Larry Donald, Cincinnati, OH
1992 - Samson Pou'ha, Kearns, UT
1993 - Jo-el Scott, Albany, NY
1994 - Lance Whitaker, Northridge, CA
1995 - Lawrence Clay-Bey, Hartford, CT
1996 - Lawrence Clay-Bey, Hartford, CT
1997 - Willie Palms, Jersey City, NJ
1998 - Dominick Guinn, Hot Springs, AR
1999 - Calvin Brock, Charlotte, NC
2000 - T. J. Wilson, Tulsa, OK
2001 - Jason Estrada, Providence, RI
2002 - Jason Estrada, Providence, RI
2003 - Jason Estrada, Providence, RI
2004 - Mike Wilson, Central Point, OR
2005 - Mike Wilson, Central Point, OR
2006 - Jonte Willis, (Mike Wilson tested positive)
2007 - Michael Hunter Las Vegas
2008 - Lenroy Thompson, Lenexa, KS
2009 - Michael Hunter Las Vegas
2010 - Lenroy Thompson, Lenexa, KS
2011 - Jonathan Hamm, St. Paul, MN
2012 - Isaac Boes, Grand Rapids, MI
2013 - Stephan Shaw, St.Louis, MO

Super-heavy